Siegfried Hug (4 December 1935 – 29 November 2020) was a German cross-country skier. He competed in the men's 30 kilometre event at the 1960 Winter Olympics.

References

External links
 

1935 births
2020 deaths
German male cross-country skiers
Olympic cross-country skiers of the United Team of Germany
Cross-country skiers at the 1960 Winter Olympics
Sportspeople from Freiburg (region)
People from Breisgau-Hochschwarzwald